MIDS may refer to:

 Madras Institute of Development Studies, Chennai, Tamil Nadu, India
 Master of Information and Data Science, a professional degree offered by University of California, Berkeley School of Information
 Multifunctional Information Distribution System, a communication component
 A nickname for Mid-Annandale F.C., in Lockerbie, Scotland

See also
 MID (disambiguation)

de:MIDS